USS San Jacinto (CG-56) is a  in the United States Navy. She is named for the Battle of San Jacinto, the decisive battle of the Texas Revolution.

Construction
San Jacinto was laid down on 24 July 1985, by Ingalls Shipbuilding, in Pascagoula, Mississippi. She was launched on 11 November 1986, and commissioned 23 January 1988, by then vice-president George H. W. Bush in Houston, Texas.

Service history 
She completed her fitting out and work-ups, then deployed to the Mediterranean Sea in late May 1989, returning in November. While San Jacinto and her sister ship  were underway off the Virginia coast, performing testing of CEC, the Iraqi army invaded and occupied Kuwait. The next day, Leyte Gulf detached and headed back to Mayport, Florida. The day after, San Jacinto returned to her homeport of Norfolk, Virginia, to prepare for the massive armada to the Middle East.

After CINCLANT had all their ships provisioned, barely five days later, San Jacinto headed for the Mediterranean.

She fired the opening shots of Operation Desert Storm with the launch of two BGM-109 Tomahawk cruise missiles, firing a total of 16 missiles during the 43-day war. She was also the first ship of her class to be deployed with a full load of 122 missiles. While stationed in a search area at the southern tip of the Sinai Peninsula in the Red Sea, her Visit, Boarding, Search & Seizure (VBSS) teams inspected several dozen ships for contraband being smuggled for the Iraqi government.

During her 2000-2001 deployment with Carrier Group Two, she deployed with Helicopter Antisubmarine Squadron Light 42 (HSL-42) Det 8 with two SH-60B Seahawks.

On 26 May 2010, San Jacintos VBSS team rescued five Yemenis hostages from 13 suspected pirates. The master stated his dhow had been under pirate control for one day only. The VBSS team detained the pirates on the dhow without conflict.

The cruiser suffered damage to her sonar dome. Due to the emergency dry docking, San Jacinto was unable to join Carrier Strike Group Ten and aircraft carrier  deployment to the Persian Gulf. The cruiser has undergone approximately $11 million in repairs since the accident.

Later in 2020, San Jacinto was deployed to Cape Verde to as a deterrent to any attempts to aid Venezuelan diplomat Alex Saab in fleeing the island prior to being extradicted to the U.S. on money-laundering charges.

In December 2020 the U.S. Navy's Report to Congress on the Annual Long-Range Plan for Construction of Naval Vessels stated their intention to decommission the ship in Fiscal Year 2022. The Navy formally asked Congress for permission to decommission the ship in the FY2022 budget in July 2021 along with six other cruisers, but Congress only allowed the Navy to retire five cruisers, and the Navy chose to retain San Jacinto. The Navy again asked Congress for permission to retire the ship in the 2023 budget request, and as of June 2022 the budget is still being debated.

Awards
 Navy Unit Commendation (2020)

Notes

External links
 USS San Jacinto webpage 

 

Ticonderoga-class cruisers
Ships built in Pascagoula, Mississippi
1986 ships
Cold War cruisers of the United States
Gulf War ships of the United States
Cruisers of the United States